The , also known as Nitta-no-shō, was a vast shōen, or landed estate dating the from Heian period which existed in Kōzuke Province (present-day Gunma Prefecture) from the late Heian period into the Muromachi period. It was the home territory of the Nitta clan, which played an important role in the Kemmu restoration which overthrew the Kamakura shogunate and subsequent wars of the Nanboku-chō period. In the year 2000, eleven sites connected with the Nitta-no-shō within the city of Ōta, Gunma were collectively designated a National Historic Site of Japan.

Overview
In 1108 AD, Minamoto no Yoshikuni obtained rights to a large territory in Kōzuke Province which had been devastated by the eruption of Mount Asama. This territory was on the left bank of the Tone River and extended for the entirety of ancient Nitta County, and much of  Sai County,  Sari County, and a portion of Hanzawa County in Musashi Province. In modern terms, this corresponds to all of the area of the cities of Ōta, Isesaki and Midori. Yoshikuni had already laid claim to a similar vast estate, Ashikaga-shō in Shimotsuke Province in 1142.  In 1157, Yoshikuni, together with this son Minamoto no Yoshishige nominally donated this estate to the Buddhist temple of Kongoshin-in which had been established by Emperor Toba and to the court noble Fujiwara no Tadamasa, and accepted the title of "steward". This had the effect of converting the estate into an autonomous tax-free shōen completely independent of outside control. Yoshishige's armed retainers continually expanded the borders of his estate at the expense of his weaker neighbors, and his descendants took the surname of "Nitta" after the name of the manor.

Despite the death of Nitta Yoshisada in the early Muromachi period and the rise of the Ashikaga shogunate, a branch of the Nitta clan continued to rule parts of the territory under the surname of "Iwamatsu" until they sided against Toyotomi Hideyoshi at the  Siege of Odawara in 1590.

The eleven sites covered under the National Historic Site designation are:

 Enfuku-ji temple precincts 
 Junisho Jinja precincts
 Sōji-ji temple precincts 
 Chōraku-ji temple precincts 
 Serada Tōshō-gū 
 Meiō-in temple precincts 
 Ikushina Jinja
 Sorimach Yakushi temple precincts 
 Eda residence ruins
 Shigeno water source
 Yatagami water source

See also
List of Historic Sites of Japan (Gunma)

References

External links
Ota City official site 
Ota Tourism official site 

Ōta, Gunma
History of Gunma Prefecture
Historic Sites of Japan